Nello Ciaccheri (8 September 1893 – 26 February 1971) was an Italian cyclist. He competed in two events at the 1924 Summer Olympics.

References

External links
 

1893 births
1971 deaths
People from Bagno a Ripoli
Italian male cyclists
Olympic cyclists of Italy
Cyclists at the 1924 Summer Olympics
Sportspeople from the Metropolitan City of Florence
Cyclists from Tuscany